Chopala is a town and union council of Gujrat District, in the Punjab province of Pakistan. It is located at 32°38'0N 74°20'0E with an altitude of 229 metres (754 feet).

References 

Populated places in Gujrat District